Lamar is an unincorporated community located in the town of St. Croix Falls, Polk County, Wisconsin, United States. The community is named for Lucius Quintus Cincinnatus Lamar II, an associate justice on the US Supreme Court and member of Congress.

Notes

Unincorporated communities in Polk County, Wisconsin
Unincorporated communities in Wisconsin